Alex Maley (26 May 1874 – 20 September 1949) was a Scottish football manager and journalist. He was the younger brother of Tom Maley and Willie Maley.

Alex Maley managed a number of clubs in Scotland and England, including Clyde, Clydebank, Hibernian and Crystal Palace.

Maley became manager of Crystal Palace in November 1925, and oversaw thirteenth- and sixth-place finishes in Division Three in 1926 and 1927 respectively. However, the next season started poorly and after a succession of defeats Maley resigned in October 1927, and returned to Scotland where he had a second spell as manager of Clydebank. He later served as a director of Hibernian.

References

1874 births
1949 deaths
Scottish football managers
Clyde F.C. managers
Clydebank F.C. (1914) managers
Hibernian F.C. managers
Crystal Palace F.C. managers
Scottish journalists
Scottish Football League managers
People from Largs